Dahira yunnanfuana is a moth of the family Sphingidae. It was described by Benjamin Preston Clark in 1925. It is found along the south-eastern slopes of the Himalaya, from Nepal through northern Myanmar to central Yunnan and Sichuan in China.

References

Dahira
Moths described in 1925